Manne Valdus Lund (4 April 1895 – 9 May 1962) was a Swedish footballer who played as a defender. He represented IFK Göteborg between 1912 and 1928, playing in a total of 341 games in all competitions. He won a total of 29 caps for the Sweden national team between 1915 and 1923 and competed in the men's tournament at the 1920 Summer Olympics.

Career statistics

International

Honours 
IFK Göteborg

 Swedish Championship: 1918

Individual

 Stor Grabb: 1926

References

External links
 

1895 births
1962 deaths
Swedish footballers
Sweden international footballers
IFK Göteborg players
Olympic footballers of Sweden
Footballers at the 1920 Summer Olympics
Footballers from Gothenburg
Association football defenders